This article is a summary of academic grading in Bangladesh''. Two types of grading systems are available in this country, grade point average (GPA) and cumulative grade point average (CGPA).

Grading system in School & College

University systemDegree evaluation with ″class″ in university''' (e.g., First Class, Second Class, Third class, Pass)

The bachelor's and master's degrees result of the public universities in Bangladesh, e.g., University of Dhaka, Jahangirnagar University, Bangladesh Agricultural University, Rajshahi University, University of Chittagong, National University, Gazipur can be classified according to the British undergraduate degree classification system, when it is evaluated with class grade. GPA above or equal to 3 is equal to 1st Class in honors degree in Bangladesh. This means:

CGPA 3.00 to 4.00 = 1st Class
CGPA 2.25 to 2.99 = 2nd Class
CGPA 2.00 to 2.24 = 3rd Class

 North South University, East Delta University, BRAC University, American International University-Bangladesh, United International University, East West University and University of Liberal Arts Bangladesh follows North American grading standards, so their grading policy is different from those of typical Bangladeshi universities.

References

External links
 http://www.bu.edu.bd/academic-policies/
 https://www.eastdelta.edu.bd/about-us/grading-system
 http://www.northsouth.edu/academic/grading-policy.html
 http://iubat.edu/
 http://www.bracu.ac.bd/academics/office-registrar/policies-and-procedures
 http://www.aiub.edu/academics/regulations
 https://web.archive.org/web/20160403002128/http://www.ewubd.edu/ewu/showDocument.php?documentid=1043
 http://www.uiu.ac.bd/academic/grading-performance-evaluation/
 http://www.uiu.ac.bd/academic/

Bangladesh
Higher education in Bangladesh
Grading